Kellyton Rodrigo de Oliveira (born 8 March 1995), is a Brazilian professional footballer who plays as a right back.

Professional career
Kellyton made his professional debut with RB Bragantino in a 1-0 Campeonato Brasileiro Série B loss to Londrinda on 26 November 2016. On 28 June 2019, Kellyton joined Gil Vicente in the Portuguese Primeira Liga. On 29 August 2019 his Gil Vincente contract was terminated by mutual consent.

References

External links
 
 ZeroZero Profile

1995 births
Living people
Footballers from Belo Horizonte
Brazilian footballers
Brazilian expatriate footballers
Sociedade Esportiva Itapirense players
Red Bull Bragantino players
Esporte Clube Internacional de Lages players
Rio Claro Futebol Clube players
Uberaba Sport Club players
Gil Vicente F.C. players
Sampaio Corrêa Futebol Clube players
Primeira Liga players
Campeonato Brasileiro Série B players
Campeonato Brasileiro Série C players
Campeonato Brasileiro Série D players
Association football fullbacks
Brazilian expatriate sportspeople in Portugal
Expatriate footballers in Portugal